Tour Femenino de San Luis is a women's staged cycle race which takes place in San Luis, Argentina.

Overall winners

Jerseys
As of the 2015 edition:
 denotes the overall race leader
 denotes the highest placed rider who is under 23 years of age
 denotes the mountains classification. 
 denotes he leader of the sprint competition
 denotes the highest placed Argentinian rider

Previous classifications
  In 2014 this jersey represented the combination classification leader
Source:

References

Sport in San Luis Province
Cycle races in Argentina